David Cole is a record producer, who has worked with Bob Seger & the Silver Bullet Band, Melissa Etheridge, Richard Marx, Steve Miller Band, Emerson Drive, NSYNC, and many others.

Early career
In 1976, David Cole began working as a Staff Engineer at the Capitol Tower, where he worked with a variety of talent, including Bob Seger & the Silver Bullet Band, Maze, Steve Miller Band, as well as Richard Marx, and Tina Turner.
He then was elevated to Staff Producer after his friend and mentor, Carter, left for another label. During that time, Cole engineered and co-produced the debut album for Richard Marx.

Cole then moved on to MCA Records for 2 years, having a hit with the group “Boys Club”, produced the debut album for Tim Feehan, and a solo record for Eagle, Timothy B. Schmit, before moving on to freelance work. 

He has since continued to  work with many artists including N’SYNC, Etheridge, and Seger, with whom he worked with for 11 years to finish his solo album, Face the Promise. He also spent 6 years as a Full-Time Instructor at The Art Institute of California – San Diego, teaching audio production.

Selected Discography

Source:

With Bob Seger
Stranger in Town
Against the Wind
Like a Rock
The Fire Inside
It's a Mystery
Face the Promise
Ride Out
I Knew You When

With Melissa Etheridge
Skin
Lucky
The Awakening
A New Thought for Christmas

With the Steve Miller Band
Abracadabra
Italian X Rays
Living in the 20th Century

With Richard Marx
Richard Marx
Repeat Offender
Days in Avalon
My Own Best Enemy

References

American record producers
Living people
Year of birth missing (living people)